Janne Hietanen (born 2 June 1978 in Oulu) is a Finnish former professional footballer who played as a defender.

References

1978 births
Living people
Sportspeople from Oulu
Finnish footballers
Finnish expatriate footballers
Finland international footballers
Finland youth international footballers
Finland under-21 international footballers
Association football defenders
FC Jazz players
Vaasan Palloseura players
La Liga players
UD Las Palmas players
Córdoba CF players
Tromsø IL players
AC Oulu players
IFK Norrköping players
Denizlispor footballers
ES Troyes AC players
K.S.V. Roeselare players
Veikkausliiga players
Ligue 2 players
Allsvenskan players
Eliteserien players
Belgian Pro League players
Süper Lig players
Expatriate footballers in Sweden
Expatriate footballers in Turkey
Expatriate footballers in Spain
Expatriate footballers in Norway
Expatriate footballers in France
Expatriate footballers in Belgium
Finnish expatriate sportspeople in Sweden
Finnish expatriate sportspeople in Turkey
Finnish expatriate sportspeople in Spain
Finnish expatriate sportspeople in Norway
Finnish expatriate sportspeople in France
Finnish expatriate sportspeople in Belgium